"Supertoys Last All Summer Long" is a science fiction short story by Brian Aldiss, first published in the UK edition of Harper's Bazaar, in its December 1969 issue. The story deals with humanity in an age of intelligent machines and of the aching loneliness endemic in an overpopulated future where child creation is controlled.

In the same year, the short story was republished in the eponymous Aldiss short-story collection Supertoys Last All Summer Long and Other Stories of Future Time, along with the tie-in stories Supertoys When Winter Comes and Supertoys in Other Seasons. The collection also contained a number of stories not tied to the Supertoys theme. The short story was later used as the basis for the first act of the feature film A.I. Artificial Intelligence directed by Steven Spielberg in 2001.

Plot 
In a dystopian future where only a quarter of the world's oversized human population is fed and living comfortably, families must request permission to bear children. Monica Swinton lives with her husband, Henry, and her young son, David, with whom she struggles to bond. She seeks help from Teddy, a robot toy companion of sorts, to try to understand why she feels unable to communicate with David, let alone feel compassion for him. David also questions Teddy about whether his mother truly loves him and wonders whether he is truly real. He attempts to write letters of his own to explain how he feels about his mother and the inner conflict he faces but all of his letters remain unfinished.

Meanwhile, the story jumps to Henry, who is in a meeting with a company he is associated with known as Synthank. They are discussing artificial life forms and bio-electronic beings for future developments. He discusses that the new AI under production will finally solve humanity's problems with experiencing personal isolation and loneliness.

Monica discovers David's unfinished letters that portray lines about love and a jealous contempt for Teddy, whom Monica always seemed to connect with more than David himself. Monica is horrified by the letters but overjoyed when Henry arrives home and she is able to share with him that the family has been chosen to give birth to a child by the Ministry of Population. It is then revealed that David is an artificial human, used as a replacement for a real child. Monica privately tells Henry that David is having verbal "malfunctioning" problems and must be sent back to the factory at once. The story ends with David thinking of the love and warmth of his mother, unaware of what is to happen next.

Characters 

Monica Swinton:
A troubled, lonely woman and less-than-compassionate mother, Monica struggles to understand her A.I. son David.  Throughout the story, she seeks a way to communicate with him and understand him. While Monica may appear selfish in the beginning as it is admitted that she is unable to love David, she is simply unable to feel love for a child that is not truly her own. Monica enjoys gardening and experiencing only the beautiful and serene parts of life which suggests she is unable to cope with a reality that doesn't appear perfect. This may be why she is unable to love David, as she is unable to accept that he is not her own, born child. Monica seeks comfort and connection in Teddy, David's robot toy companion. It would appear that she cares for this logical, basic A.I. toy more than David, but her exact feelings for Teddy remain questionable.

She is portrayed by Frances O'Connor in the film adaptation.

Loki David Swinton:
The A.I. son of Monica and Henry Swinton. Loki David Swinton struggles to feel accepted and loved by his mother, and rightly so, as she is devoid of most feelings for him. David's personality is similar to that of an average 5- to 10-year-old boy, as he is curious, slightly mischievous, and very loving towards Monica. Although David sees Teddy as a companion, he is also jealous that he is treated more as a son than David himself is. It is difficult to say how much of David's "feelings" are programmed, but the questioning of his own reality defines the character as more than an average android.

He is portrayed by Haley Joel Osment in the film adaptation.

Henry Swinton:
The husband of Monica Swinton and father to David. Little is known about this character other than that he works for a company called "Synthank" and helps to develop bio-electronic and bioengineered creations. His character appears somewhat distant from Monica, as she doesn't accompany him to the important meeting he attends in the story. However, little is known about his relationship with David and whether he shares the detachment issues Monica experiences.

He is portrayed by Sam Robards in the film adaptation.

Teddy:
David's robot toy companion. He is unable to tell lies and helps to guide both David and Monica, despite not understanding either of their situations. His knowledge is limited and his personality is simplistic, but Monica finds Teddy easier to communicate with than David. This could be for many reasons, including the possibility that Monica is not used to dealing with a robot that acts human, and Teddy does not provide this feature. He only speaks when spoken to, and seeks to comfort always.

The film adaptation portrays Teddy as a robotic teddy bear, voiced by Jack Angel.

Film adaptation  
The short story was used as the basis for the first act of the feature film A.I. Artificial Intelligence (2001). Stanley Kubrick originally obtained the rights in the 1970s to produce a film adaptation. However, the project was bogged down in development hell and was repeatedly postponed. A few years before Kubrick's death in 1999, he suggested to Steven Spielberg that it might be a project better suited for Spielberg to direct than himself. After Kubrick's death, Spielberg ultimately did direct the film, which was released in 2001.

References

External links 
 Official Brian Aldiss website and original text in full

1969 short stories
Androids in literature
Biotechnology literature
Birth control
British short stories
Dystopian literature
Fiction about motherhood
Overpopulation fiction
Science fiction short stories
Short stories about robots
Short stories adapted into films
Works by Brian Aldiss
Short stories set in the future
Works originally published in Harper's Bazaar